The Great British Bake Off Musical is a stage musical comedy with book and lyrics by Jake Brunger and music and lyrics by Pippa Cleary, based on the British television baking competition of the same name.

Production history

World premiere: Cheltenham (2022) 
The musical had its world premiere at the Everyman Theatre in Cheltenham on 23 July running until 6 August 2022. The production was directed by Rachel Kavanaugh, designed by Alice Power, produced by Mark Goucher, executive produced by Richard McKerrow in association with Love Productions. On 1 April 2022, casting was announced including John Owen-Jones and Rosemary Ashe.

West End (2023) 
On the 18th of October 2022, it was announced that the production will transfer to London's West End the following year, running from the 25 February for a 12 week limited run at the Noël Coward Theatre, featuring some members of the original Cheltenham cast reprising their roles. Full casting was announced on 1 December 2022.

Musical numbers

Act I
 "Prologue" – Company
 "The Bake Off Tent" – Jim, Kim & The Bakers
 "Obviously" – Izzy & The Bakers
 "Somewhere In The Dough" – Gemma
 "Slap It Like That" – Phil & Company
 "Bring on the Scone" – Jim, Kim, Pam & Phil 
 "Grow" – Francesca 
 "The Handshake Song" – The Bakers
 "My Dad" – Lily & Ben
 "All the Way" – Company

Act II
 "Keep On Keeping On" – Pam and Company
 "The Perfect Petit Fours" – Gemma & Ben
 "Don't Send Me Home" – Company
 "I'd Never Be Me Without You" – Phil & Pam
 "The Semi-Final" – Semi-finalists, Jim, Kim, Pam & Phil
 "Babs' Lament" - Babs
 "Rise" - Gemma
 "Finale " - Company

Cast and characters

Critical reception 
The production received mixed to positive reviews from both critics and audiences.

References

External links 
 Official website

2022 musicals
British musicals
Musicals based on television series
The Great British Bake Off
West End musicals